The Siagne is a river that flows through the Var and Alpes-Maritimes departments of southeast France. For much of its length, it forms the border between the two departments.

References

Rivers of France
Rivers of Alpes-Maritimes
Rivers of Var (department)
Rivers of Provence-Alpes-Côte d'Azur
0Siagne